Celina Midelfart (born 12 February 1973) is a Norwegian businesswoman.

Family
A member of the Midelfart family, she is a daughter of the businessman Finn-Erik Midelfart (1943–95) and Hermine Kristin née Muhle (born 1944). She is a patrilineal descendant of Hans Christian Ulrik Midelfart, a signatory of the Norwegian constitution.

Education
She was educated at London School of Economics 1994-96, where she studied economics with management, before transferring to New York University Stern School of Business, with Bachelor of Science summa cum laude in Finance in 1998.

Career
In 1995, she took over the running of the family's health and beauty care business, Midelfart AS, when her father died. The company was founded by her great-grandfather Ole Midelfart in 1923. The operative business were since sold to Procter & Gamble and Midsona AB, respectively.

Celina Midelfart is Executive Chairman and 100% owner of the investment company Midelfart Capital AS. She is also a large shareholder and board member of the Swedish consumer finance bank Avida AB. She is a board member of Siem Offshore AS and Oslo International School. She previously held various board positions, amongst others in Mowi ASA and Midsona AB.

Personal life
Celina Midelfart lives in Oslo with her son, Olav Midelfart Trøim, born 2011.

References 

1973 births
21st-century Norwegian businesswomen
21st-century Norwegian businesspeople
Living people
Place of birth missing (living people)